Liudmila Mikhailovna Bakonina, married name: Mineyeva (born 25 November 1955) is a former figure skater who represented the Soviet Union.

Results

References

Navigation

Russian female single skaters
Soviet female single skaters
Living people
1955 births
Figure skaters from Moscow